Battsengel ("Firm happiness") is a sum (district) of Arkhangai Province in central Mongolia. Battsengel is home to approximately 3,289 inhabitants.

History

Formation of the cape 
In 1696, when the army of Qing, with the participation of Khalkh princes, defeated the army of Galdan Boshgot Khan of Oirad, Namjil, the son of Toba Taiji, a nobleman of Tumenhen, earned the title of Taiji. The governor presented the award. Later, Tumenhen, in recognition of the good efforts of Oirat fighting on behalf of Mr. Manji of Sain noyon's lineage, cut off 19 counties from the territory of the khan province and established the province of Khalkh in 1725.

Modern History 
The 12 Year Secondary School won an award for best school of Arkhangai Aimag in 2012.

References 

Populated places in Mongolia
Districts of Arkhangai Province

fi:Battsengel